George Latimer (born 1935) was the mayor of Saint Paul, Minnesota, the state's capital city, from 1976 until 1990. A member of the DFL and a labor lawyer by profession, Latimer was known for his redevelopment of St. Paul's downtown core, serving as mayor during a period when St. Paul's population was declining somewhat as some residents moved to suburban areas while the city's ethnic diversity increased as, among others, Hmong refugees from Vietnam and Laos resettled in Saint Paul.

Born in Schenectady, New York, Latimer attended Saint Michael's College and Columbia Law School and practiced law in Saint Paul from 1963 until he was elected mayor. Latimer is of Irish and Lebanese ancestry.

In 1986, Latimer unsuccessfully sought the DFL nomination for governor, losing the primary to incumbent Rudy Perpich. His running mate was Arvonne Fraser, wife of Minneapolis Mayor Donald M. Fraser. Perpich went on to win the general election.

In 1987, Latimer served as a selection committee member for the Rudy Bruner Award for Urban Excellence.

After his mayoral tenure, he served as dean of Hamline University's law school from 1990 to 1993 and as a special adviser to Henry Cisneros, President Bill Clinton's Housing and Urban Development secretary, from 1993 to 1995.

An expert on urban affairs and urban development, Latimer has lectured on those topics as a visiting professor of Urban Studies and Geography at Macalester College in Saint Paul since 1996.

From January 1996 to January 1998, Latimer was CEO of the National Equity Fund, which manages approximately 27,000 housing units in 35 cities and provides affordable housing for working people through use of the Low Income Tax Credit.

Latimer has now been in the business world for several years, serving since 2001 as a director of Indentix Incorporated (formerly Visionics until a merger with Indentix in 2002).  Latimer served on the Harvard Kennedy School's Executive Session on Policy at Harvard University and as Regent of the University of Minnesota.  He also works part-time as a labor arbitrator.  St Paul Central Library was renamed George Latimer Central Library in 2014 in his honor by then mayor Chris Coleman.

Latimer was one of several people who delivered a eulogy at the public memorial service, held at the University of Minnesota and televised on local stations and C-SPAN, after the death of U.S. Senator Paul Wellstone.

References

External links
George Latimer profile at Forbes.com
George Latimer papers at the Minnesota Historical Society
George Latimer profile at Macalester's web site

1935 births
Living people
American financial businesspeople
American politicians of Lebanese descent
Columbia Law School alumni
Harvard University faculty
Mayors of Saint Paul, Minnesota
Minnesota Democrats
Macalester College faculty